The Anglican Diocese of Udi is one of 12 within the Anglican Province of Enugu, itself one of 14 provinces within the Church of Nigeria.

The current bishop is Chjioke Augustine Aneke.

Notes

Church of Nigeria dioceses
Dioceses of the Province of Enugu